Calvert is an unincorporated community in Cecil County, Maryland, United States, approximately six miles east of Rising Sun.

History
The community was named for George Calvert, 1st Baron Baltimore.

Attractions
The John Churchman House and Elisha Kirk House are listed on the National Register of Historic Places.

Notable people
Mary E. Ireland (1834-1927), author, translator
Joseph Mendenhall (1920-2013), diplomat, was born in Calvert.

References

External links

Churchman History
Brick Meeting House Historical Marker Database
Calvert Village Historical Marker Database

Unincorporated communities in Maryland
Unincorporated communities in Cecil County, Maryland